Niña de mi corazón (English title: A Double Identity) is a Mexican telenovela produced by Pedro Damián for Televisa that aired on Canal de las Estrellas from March 8, 2010 to July 9, 2010. It is a remake of the Mexican telenovela Mi pequeña traviesa, also produced by Pedro Damián.

Paulina Goto and Erick Elías starred as protagonists, Maribel Guardia and Arturo Peniche starred as co-protagonists, while Lorena Herrera, Lisette Morelos Julio Camejo and Martha Julia starred as antagonists.

In the United States, Univision broadcast Niña de mi corazón from February 28, 2011 to June 17, 2011.

Plot
Andrea Paz (Paulina Goto) is a 17-year-old working-class girl. Her dream is to finish school and become a lawyer. Andrea's aspirations fall apart when she learns that her father Benigno (José Elías Moreno) was run over by a car, and left in a wheelchair as a result. Abandoned by her mother, and with two brothers to support, Andréa is forced to leave everything behind and begin an adult life, work, and pay the household bills as well as supporting her dad. To make matters worse, her brother Damián (Adriano Zendejas) gets into drugs.

Thanks to Vittorio, a friend of the family, Andrea gets a job at Maximo's (Arturo Peniche) law firm, as the assistant of the owners' son Darío (Erick Elías). Moira (Lisette Morelos), Dario's girlfriend, doesn't like that Dario works with a woman, so she convinces Maximo to fire her and hire a man. Andrea returns disguised as a man, and says that she is Andrés, her twin brother. After some time at the law firm, Máximo offers Andrea a job as a receptionist. With two jobs and two identities, Andrea has to be agile and cunning.

Cast

Main
Maribel Guardia as Pilar Alarcón de Arrioja
Arturo Peniche as Máximo Arrioja Riquelme
Erick Elías as Darío Arrioja Alarcón
Lorena Herrera as Silvana Quinto Vda. de Casca
Paulina Goto as Andrea Paz "La Niña"/Andrés Paz

Also main

Lisette Morelos as Moira Gasca Quinto
Julio Camejo as Jason "Papi" Bravo López
Ximena Herrera as María Magdalena Bravo López
Martha Julia as Tamara Díez
Rafael Inclán as Vittorio Conti
José Elías Moreno as Sr. Benigno Paz
Alberto Estrella as El Ángel Uriel
Gerardo Albarrán as Donato Blume
Lucero Lander as Eloísa
Lorena Velázquez as Mercedes Riquelme Vda. de Arrioja
Isela Vega as Doña Belén
Osvaldo de León as Juan Vicente Huerta
Zoraida Gómez as Carolina Clavados
Brandon Peniche as Conrado Gayardo "Masiosare/Cónsul"
Jon Ecker as El Mudra
Adriano Zendejas as Damián Paz
Mané de la Parra as Charly
Luis Ceballos as Alfonso Fernández "El Vocho"
Carlos Speitzer as El Geek
Jade Fraser as Ximena Arrioja Alarcón
Evelyn Cedeño as Priscila
Roberto Assad as Boris Rey
Uriel del Toro as Bruno
Elsa Marín as Petra Morales
Lourdes Canale as Doña Trinidad "Trini"
Bárbara Torres as Florencia
Ale Müller as Evelyn
Tatiana Martínez as El Bombón de la Discordia

Special participation

Polo Ortin as Mercedonio
Jaime Garza as Dionisio Bravo
Carlos Cámara Jr. as Dimitri Molotov
África Zavala as Rosario "Chayo" Cruz
Harold Azuara as José "Pepe" Cruz
Jocelin Zuckerman as Perla Cruz

Awards and nominations

TVyNovelas Awards

People en Español Awards

Kids Choice México Awards

References

External links 

2010 telenovelas
2010 Mexican television series debuts
2010 Mexican television series endings
Television shows set in Mexico
Mexican telenovelas
Televisa telenovelas
Children's telenovelas
Teen telenovelas
Television series about teenagers
Television series reboots
Spanish-language telenovelas